LLE can stand for
Laboratory for Laser Energetics, Rochester, NY, US
Liquid–liquid extraction as a chemical separation method.
Llanelli railway station, Carmarthenshire, Wales (National Rail station code)
Locally linear embedding.
 Low-Level Emulation
Lugiato-Lefever equation, a framework for the study of spontaneous pattern formation in nonlinear optical systems.